The 2005–06 AHL season was the 70th season of the American Hockey League. Twenty-seven teams played 80 games each in the schedule. The Hershey Bears won the Calder Cup, defeating the Milwaukee Admirals in the finals.

To celebrate the AHL's 70th anniversary,  the league announced on January 6, 2006, the first inductees into the AHL's new Hall of Fame . The first inductees were; Johnny Bower, Jack Butterfield, Jody Gage, Fred Glover, Willie Marshall, Frank Mathers and Eddie Shore.

Team changes
The Cincinnati Mighty Ducks suspend operations, becoming dormant.
The Edmonton Road Runners suspend operations, becoming dormant.
The Utah Grizzlies suspend operations, becoming dormant.
The dormant Saint John Flames resumed operations as the Omaha Ak-Sar-Ben Knights, playing in the West division.
The dormant Louisville Panthers resumed operations as the Iowa Stars, playing in the West division.
The St. John's Maple Leafs moved to Toronto, Ontario, becoming the Toronto Marlies.
The Worcester IceCats moved to Peoria, Illinois, becoming the Peoria Rivermen, playing in the West division.
The Albany River Rats shift from the East division to the Atlantic division.
The Grand Rapids Griffins shift from the West division to the North division.

Final standings
Note: GP = Games played; W = Wins; L = Losses; OTL = Overtime losses; SL = Shootout losses; GF = Goals for; GA = Goals against; Pts = Points;

Eastern Conference

Western Conference

Scoring leaders

Note: GP = Games played; G = Goals; A = Assists; Pts = Points; PIM = Penalty minutes

Leading goaltenders

Note: GP = Games played; Mins = Minutes played; W = Wins; L = Losses: OTL = Overtime losses; SL = Shootout losses; GA = Goals Allowed; SO = Shutouts; GAA = Goals against average

Calder Cup playoffs

All Star Classic
The 19th AHL All-Star Classic was played on February 1, 2006, at the MTS Centre in Winnipeg, Manitoba. Team Canada defeated team PlanetUSA 9–4. In the skills competition held the night before, team Canada defeated team PlanetUSA 21–12 in front of two sellout crowds of 15,115, the largest for an AHL event.

Trophy and award winners

Team awards

Individual awards

Other awards

See also
List of AHL seasons

References
AHL official site
AHL Hall of Fame
HockeyDB

 
American Hockey League seasons
2
2